Falaën Castle is a château-ferme, or fortified farmhouse, in the village of Falaën, municipality of Onhaye, province of Namur, Wallonia, Belgium.

See also
List of castles in Belgium
 List of protected heritage sites in Onhaye

External links
 

Castles in Belgium
Castles in Namur (province)